Peace of Thorn may refer to:
 Peace of Thorn (1411)
Second Peace of Thorn (1466)
Compromise of Thorn (1521)
 Treaty of Thorn (1709), the renewal of the Saxo-Russian alliance during the Great Northern War